Alissa Moreno is an American singer, songwriter, musician, and actress. Her music incorporates elements of Indie-pop, Country, Americana, and Folk. Her co-write "Every Day", recorded by Rascal Flatts, reached No. 2 on the Billboard Hot Country Songs charts and earned a Grammy nomination. She wrote and performed the theme song, Sisters for the ABC hit comedy, Hope & Faith as well as writing and performing the show ID, Far From Here, for Army Wives.  Moreno's songs have been in numerous films and TV shows and have been recorded by many recording artists including John Oates, Javier Colon, Al Anderson, Morgan Heritage, Elvis Blue, and Mallary Hope.

Career
Moreno is a singer, songwriter, and musician best known for her co-write, Every Day, recorded by Rascal Flatts, which received a Grammy nomination.

In 2006 she signed a publishing deal with Universal Music Group. Moreno has written songs with and for  Colbie Caillat, Vertical Horizon, John Oates, and Javier Colon, and other recording artists. She has performed at The Opry, Hotel Café, The Viper Room, and the House of Blues, among other venues.  In 2014 she wrote the song, Notice Me, for the young adult novel series, Wildflower and Shine Our Light for the 2015, The Road to You, both written by Alecia Whitaker, published by Little, Brown Book for Young Readers.

She created and starred in the 2005 short film, Super Chicks, and was the vocal coach to Ben Affleck for his SAG award-winning role in Hollywoodland.

Moreno has released two                                                                                                                studio albums and was signed to Vere Music in 2022.

Discography
 2021 - "Meet Again"
 2019 – "Girls Go Hard"
 2016 – "Getaway Car"
 2012 – "What You're Made Of"  
 2011 – "Unbreakable"
 2010 – "Original Songwriter Demos, Vol. 2", "Every Day", Warner Records
 2008 – "In Your Wake"
 2006 – MTV Presents Laguna Beach – Summer Can Last Forever, "Next Time", Interscope Records

"Every Day"
"Every Day", recorded by Rascal Flatts, was written by Moreno and Jeffrey Steele in 2008.  
 Steele sent the song to record producer Dann Huff, who recommended the song to Rascal Flatts. The group recorded it for their Still Feels Good album, giving Moreno her second outside cut as a songwriter.

"Every Day" was nominated for a Grammy Award for Best Country Performance By a Duo or Group With Vocals in 2009.

The song debuted at number 42 on the Hot Country Songs chart dated March 8, 2008, reaching a peak of number 2 on that chart on the chart week of June 14, 2008.

Songs Written for Other Artists
 2020 - 3 Minute Movies recorded by Angus Gill on 3 Minute Movies album - writer
 2018 - Pineapple Wine recorded by Morgan Heritage on Avrakedabra album (Grammy nomination for "Best Reggae Album) - writer
 2017 - The Yee-Haw Song recorded by Duck Dynasty’s Uncle Si & The Sicotics - writer
 2016 - Walking Blind recorded by Javier Colon on Gravity album - writer
 2016 - Santa Be Good To Me recorded by John Oates and The Time Jumpers - writer  
 2012 - Strings recorded by Big Al Anderson featuring Vince Gill and Jerry Douglas - writer
 2012 - Why (Nothing Else Matters) recorded by Kelly Sweet - writer
 2011 - Only Wanna Be With You recorded by Elvis Blue - writer
 2010 - That's My Little Girl and When recorded by Javier Colon winner The Voice (American season 1)  - writer
 2008 - Every Day (Grammy Nominated) recorded by Rascal Flatts - writer

Awards

|-
|  || "Every Day" || BMI – Million-Air Award – Over One Million U.S. Radio Plays  || 
|-
|  || "Better" || Just Plain Folks Music Songwriting Award || 
|-
|  || "Every Day" || CMT Music Award – Music Video of the Year || 
|-
|  || "Every Day" || BMI Country Award – Most Played BMI Country Songs  || 
|-
|  || "Every Day"  || Grammy Award – Best Performance by Group or Duo || 
|-
|  || "Far From Here"  || Durango Songwriter's Expo - Write With the Hitmakers Contest/Pop Rock||

Songs in TV and film
In 2008, Moreno's debut album, In Your Wake, was released on her label, Pi Records. Her first single, "Far From Here", was the theme song for the Lifetime television series Army Wives. Her song "Next Time" appeared on the soundtrack of the reality TV show Laguna Beach, and she co-wrote the theme song for the TV show Hope and Faith.

Early life
Moreno was born in Ramah, New Mexico to Drake and Heather (Née) Moreno, who were elementary school teachers at the Ramah Navajo Indian Reservation. She began playing the violin at age two and learned to play the piano at five. She picked up the guitar at age 17. When asked by J.T. Ellison, during an interview about how she decided to become a singer-songwriter, Moreno replied, "I vacillated back and forth between actor and musician, but music came very easily, and it seemed more immediate. I pictured myself reciting monologues at parties, and then I pictured myself playing guitar and singing around a campfire. Music won". She attended Albuquerque High School and earned a Bachelor of Fine Arts degree at the Santa Fe University of Art and Design.

External links

References

Year of birth missing (living people)
Living people
American women pop singers
American women singer-songwriters
American women guitarists
People from New Mexico
Singer-songwriters from California
Guitarists from Los Angeles
21st-century American pianists
21st-century American women pianists